Streptomyces xiangtanensis is a bacterium species from the genus of Streptomyces which has been isolated from soil near the Xiangtan Manganese Mine.

See also 
 List of Streptomyces species

References 

xiangtanensis
Bacteria described in 2021